The Blakes LP is The Blakes' first commercially available album (previous releases were independent and available at shows etc...), originally self-released in 2006. After gaining national exposure due to radio play on Seattle-based independent radio station, KEXP, the band signed to local label Light In The Attic. On their new record label, The Blakes LP was remastered and re-released with new album cover art and two additional tracks, "Magoo" and "Run".

Track listing

2006 self-release 
 "Two Times" - 2:40
 "Don't Bother Me" - 2:50
 "Modern Man" - 2:37
 "Commit" - 2:36
 "Don't Want That Now" - 2:20
 "Vampire" - 2:43
 "Lint Walk" - 2:50
 "Lie Next To Me" - 2:47
 "Pistol Grip" - 2:03
 "Picture" - 2:35
 "Streets" - 3:51

2007 re-release 
 "Two Times" - 2:40
 "Don't Bother Me" - 2:50
 "Magoo" - 1:57
 "Modern Man" - 2:37
 "Run" - 2:57
 "Commit" - 2:36
 "Don't Want That Now" - 2:20
 "Lint Walk" - 2:50
 "Vampire" - 2:43
 "Lie Next To Me" - 2:47
 "Pistol Grip" - 2:03
 "Picture" - 2:35
 "Streets" - 3:51

Bonus tracks 
  "Looking For Love Again" (iTunes release) - 2:36
  "Wrong Side" (iTunes release) - 2:46

Videos 
 "Don't Bother Me" Director: Travis Senger; Producer: Michael J. Mouncer; Cinematographer: Sean Porter
 "Don't Want That Now" Director: unknown; Producer: unknown; Cinematographer: unknown

Personnel 
 Garnet Keim – vocals, guitar
 Snow Keim – vocals, bass
 Bob Husak – drums

References 

2006 albums
2007 albums